Run the Race  is a 2018 American Christian drama film directed by Chris Dowling. It follows two young brothers who use football to cope with their mother's death and father's abandonment of them. Tim Tebow acts as an executive producer on the film. It was released in the United States on February 22, 2019, by Roadside Attractions.

Production
Filming for the movie took place in Birmingham, Alabama. Tim Tebow and his brother, Robbie Tebow, served as executive producers of the film.

Release
In October 2018, Roadside Attractions acquired the film and set it for a February 22, 2019 release.

Reception

Box office
The film made $2.3 million in its opening weekend, finishing 10th at the box office.

Critical response
On Metacritic, the film has a weighted average score of 35 out of 100, based on 4 critics, indicating "generally unfavorable reviews".

References

External links